Qarajeh (also Romanized as Qarājeh; also known as Karaja and Qarah Jeh) is a village in Bedevostan-e Gharbi Rural District, Khvajeh District, Heris County, East Azerbaijan Province, Iran. At the 2006 census, its population was 1,081, in 215 families.

References 

Populated places in Heris County